Maryland Wing, Civil Air Patrol (abbreviated MDWG) is the highest echelon of Civil Air Patrol in the U.S. state of Maryland. Its headquarters (HQ) is located in Granite, Maryland on the site of a former Nike Missile Base (BA-79). Granite is a tiny unincorporated community just northwest of Woodstock; the missile base and HQ have a listed mailing address of 3085 Hernwood Road Woodstock, MD. The Maryland Wing oversees 26 primary subordinate squadrons located throughout the state, including four school enrichment programs.  The wing currently has a fleet of 11 aircraft made up of Cessna 172s, 182s, and a Gippsland GA-8 Airvan. More than 1,400 members serve in Civil Air Patrol’s Maryland Wing.

Mission

The Maryland Wing performs the three missions of Civil Air Patrol: providing emergency services; offering cadet programs for youth; and providing aerospace education for both CAP members and the general public.

Emergency services

Civil Air Patrol provides emergency services, which includes performing search and rescue and disaster relief missions; as well as assisting in humanitarian aid assignments. CAP also provides Air Force support through conducting light transport, communications support, and low-altitude route surveys. Civil Air Patrol can also offer support to counter-drug missions.

Cadet programs

Civil Air Patrol offers a cadet program for youth aged 12 to 20, which includes aerospace education, leadership training, physical fitness and moral leadership.

Aerospace education

Civil Air Patrol offers aerospace education for CAP members and the general public, including providing training to the members of CAP, and offering workshops for youth throughout the nation through schools and public aviation events.

History

Two Maryland Wing aircrew members die in search of military jet

On 6 April 1954, at 1:05 p.m., Capt. Anthony J. Synodinos, CAP, and Chaplain (1st Lt.) Edward G. Conrad, CAP, died when their open-cockpit Ryan PT-22 airplane crashed into the water near Havre de Grace, MD.  The two men, both members of the East Baltimore Squadron, were conducting a search and rescue mission for a missing T-33 military jet that was reported as missing and was never found.  The search area was long, stretching from Long Island, N.Y., to Langley Field (now Joint Base Langley-Eustis), VA.  Synodinos, serving as mission pilot, and Conrad, mission observer, had been searching the upper Chesapeake Bay in heavy fog.

In 1960, Maryland Wing dedicated a plaque in Havre de Grace, MD; to memorialize these two Civil Air Patrol members who died in service to their country.

On 3 April 2004, the Harford Composite Squadron relocated the marker and established a new plaque which commemorated the 50th anniversary of their deaths.  Commanded by Lt. Col. Gerard W. Weiss, the Harford squadron held  a ceremony installing the new plaque at the War Memorial in Millard Tydings Memorial Park near Commerce Street at S. Washington Street in Havre de Grace, MD. (39° 32.308′ N, 76° 5.372′ W).

The plaque reads:

In memory of Capt. Anthony J. Synodinos, CAP 
Chaplain (1 Lt.) Edward G. Conrad, CAP
They died April 6, 1954, in an airplane crash off this point while performing a search and rescue mission. Service like theirs with thoughts more for others than themselves will lead to a far better world to live in.

Original plaque dedicated by the Maryland Wing, Civil Air Patrol, 1960

New plaque dedicated by Harford Composite Squadron, Civil Air Patrol, United States Air Force Auxiliary.

Buzz One Four - B-52 Bomber Crash – 13 January 1964

A B-52D Stratofortress, from the 484th Bomb Wing, carrying nuclear weapons with its five-man crew crashed near Lonaconing, Md., near the Appalachian Mountains of Western Maryland.  The aircraft left Westover Air Force Base, Massachusetts on its way to Turner Air Force base in Albany, Georgia, but disappeared from contact.  It was determined the B-52 crashed due to a blizzard resulting from two storm fronts converging while flying over Maryland.  During the turbulence created by the fronts, the aircraft’s vertical tail fin snapped off the plane, hitting the left horizontal stabilizer and tail gunner’s pod. This resulted in the aircraft rolling onto its back and descending into a spin.

Civil Air Patrol was alerted and Maryland Wing aircrews spotted the B-52's co-pilot, who had ejected, Capt. Parker Peedin, about two miles from Grantsville, MD; and directed ground teams to rescue.  The pilot, Maj. Tom McCormick, also ejected and, after walking nearly two miles, was located and transported to Cumberland for medical treatment.  Sgt. Mel Wooten, tail gunner, who was riding up front; not in the tail, ejected, but was injured by parts of the aircraft and landed near the Casselman River near Salisbury, Pennsylvania. Unfortunately he did not survive.  Maj. Robert Payne, navigator, parachuted from the aircraft but fell into a partially frozen stream where his body was found by rescuers.  The fifth crew member, Bombardier Robert Townley, died in the plane.

Maryland State Police took command of the area due to the two, 24-megaton nuclear bombs the aircraft was carrying.  The bombs were recovered and taken to Cumberland Municipal Airport for transport.

Memorials have been erected in memory of the crew members. A large memorial can be seen along U.S. Route 40, about a mile east of Grantsville, MD.  The Grantsville Community Museum has artifacts on display from the crash.

Squadrons

Disbanded squadrons

Past Wing commanders

Mary Feik Achievement

The Mary Feik Achievement is awarded for successfully completing the requirements associated with Achievement 3 in Phase I of the Civil Air Patrol cadet program; it includes promotion to the grade of Cadet Senior Airman. Mary Feik, who was an active member of the Annapolis Composite Squadron, resided in Annapolis, Maryland, until her death in June 2016. Col. Feik was known for giving an aerospace education related presentation at the annual Tri-Wing Encampment sponsored by Maryland Wing, Delaware Wing, and the National Capital Wing.

Spaatz Award Achievement

The General Carl A. Spaatz Award is the highest award in the Civil Air Patrol cadet program.  The award honors General Carl A. Spaatz, who was the first Chief of Staff of the United States Air Force and the second National Commander of Civil Air Patrol.

First awarded in 1964, only 0.5% of CAP cadets ever earn the Spaatz award. Maryland ranks 9th among the 50 U.S. states in the number of Spaatz awards earned (1st - Florida; 2nd - California; 3rd - New York; 4th - Texas; 5th - Illinois; 6th - Pennsylvania; 7th - North Carolina; 8th - Virginia). Award recipients from Maryland include:

Legal protection

Civil Air Patrol Leave Act of 2010 
Employers within the borders of Maryland are required by law to provide at minimum 15 days per calendar year of leave for Civil Air Patrol volunteer members to respond to emergency missions as authorized by the U.S. Air Force, Governor or political subdivision as a part of Civil Air Patrol. The member must provide documentation to the employer if requested. This law was signed by Gov. Martin O'Malley on May 20, 2010.

See also
Maryland Air National Guard
Maryland Defense Force

References

External links
National HQ
 CAP NHQ

Mid-Atlantic Region HQ
Mid-Atlantic Region

Maryland Wing HQ
 Maryland Wing

Maryland Wing Squadron websites
 
 Annapolis Composite Squadron
 Arundel Composite Squadron
 Bethesda-Chevy Chase Composite Squadron
 Bowie Composite Squadron
 Carroll Composite Squadron
 Charles Composite Squadron
 Easton Composite Squadron
 Fort McHenry Composite Squadron
 Granite Cadet Squadron
 Hyde Field Senior Squadron
 Glenn L. Martin Composite Squadron
 Montgomery Senior Squadron
 Mount Airy Composite Squadron
 Osprey Composite Squadron
 St. Marys Composite Squadron
 Towson Composite Squadron
 Upper Montgomery Composite Squadron
 Wicomico Composite Squadron

Military in Maryland
Wings of the Civil Air Patrol